Chariton freight station is an historic building located in Chariton, Iowa, United States. Chariton was a wholesale and distribution center for southern Iowa when the Chicago, Burlington, and Quincy Railroad built the freight house in 1904. It reflected the town's importance as a division point for the railroad. The structure contains  of interior space.   The depot was listed on the National Register of Historic Places in 2003 as the Chicago, Burlington, and Quincy Freight House-Chariton.

Photo gallery

References

Railway stations in the United States opened in 1904
Chariton, Iowa
Former Chicago, Burlington and Quincy Railroad stations
Transportation buildings and structures in Lucas County, Iowa
Railway stations on the National Register of Historic Places in Iowa
National Register of Historic Places in Lucas County, Iowa